The Illinois Service, branded Amtrak Illinois, comprises three passenger rail routes operated by Amtrak in the American state of Illinois. The Illinois Service is funded primarily by the Illinois Department of Transportation (IDOT).

Chicago is a terminus for all three Illinois Service routes, which all have multiple daily round trips:
 Chicago–Quincy: two round trips daily, the Illinois Zephyr and the Carl Sandburg
 Chicago–St. Louis Lincoln Service: four round trips daily and the only route that serves another state
 Chicago–Carbondale: two round trips daily, the Illini and the Saluki, and the only route whose trains have checked baggage service

Proposed expansion

There are plans for two new Illinois Service routes:
 Chicago–Rockford Black Hawk: based on a former service to Dubuque that ran from 1974 to 1981, the route will use Metra and Union Pacific lines west from Chicago via Elgin
 Chicago–Moline Quad Cities: uses the existing Chicago–Quincy route between Chicago and Princeton, branching from it west of Wyanet to serve the Quad Cities via Geneseo

The routes were to have been added in late 2015 but were put on hold by then-Governor Bruce Rauner. They were resurrected and funded in 2019 as part of a transportation bill supported by Governor J.B. Pritzker.

In addition to the two new routes, a committee was formed in late 2021 to study and promote extending the Chicago–Quincy route to Hannibal, Missouri.

In early 2022, studies are underway to reinstate Amtrak service to Peoria from Chicago.

See also
Hiawatha Service

References

External links
Illinois Service on Amtrak's website
Amtrak Illinois on IDOT's website

Amtrak routes
Passenger rail transportation in Illinois